Sunlight  is the debut solo studio album by Irish singer Nicky Byrne. It was released on May 6, 2016, by Universal Music.

Track listing

Charts

Credits
Licensed To – Universal Music Ireland
Phonographic Copyright (p) – Studz Limited
Manufactured By – EDC, Germany
Lead Vocals, Backing Vocals, Written-By – Nicky Byrne
Management – Tim Byrne (2)
Mastered By – Alex Wharton (tracks: 2 to 10), Tom Coyne (tracks: 1)
Mixed By – Greg French (tracks: 2 to 10), Serban Ghenea (tracks: 1)
Photography By – Lili Forberg
Producer, Arranged By, Recorded By, Mixed By, Keyboards, Programmed By, Written-By – Ronan Hardiman (tracks: 2 to 10)
Written-By – Don Mescall (tracks: 2, 4, 5, 8, 9, 10), Wayne Hector (tracks: 1, 3, 6, 7)
Barcode: 6 02547 89319 2
Mastering SID Code: IFPI LV26
Mould SID Code: IFPI 0139
Matrix / Runout: 06025 478 931-9 01 + 53948157
Label Code: LC01846

References

2016 debut albums
Universal Music Group albums